Nectocaecilia petersii is a species of semiaquatic amphibian in the family Typhlonectidae. It belongs to the monotypic genus Nectocaecilia. This species is found in Venezuela and possibly Brazil and Colombia. Its natural habitats are subtropical or tropical moist lowland forests and rivers, and it is threatened by habitat loss. This species has a number of distinct traits that illustrate that it is a burrowing vertebrate, including its very small eyes and long, thin body.

References

Typhlonectidae
Monotypic amphibian genera
Amphibians described in 1882
Taxonomy articles created by Polbot